The Château de Pierrefonds is a castle situated in the commune of Pierrefonds in the Oise department in the region of Hauts-de-France, France. It is on the southeast edge of the Forest of Compiègne, northeast of Paris, between Villers-Cotterêts and Compiègne.

The Château de Pierrefonds includes most of the characteristics of defensive military architecture from the Middle Ages, though it underwent a major restoration in the 19th century.

History

In the 12th century, a castle was built on this site. Two centuries later, in 1392, King Charles VI turned the County of Valois (of which Pierrefonds was part) into a Duchy and gave it to his brother Louis, Duke of Orléans. From 1393 to his death in 1407, the latter had the castle rebuilt by the court architect, Jean le Noir.

In March 1617, during the early troubled days of Louis XIII's reign, the castle,        then the property of François-Annibal d'Estrées (brother of the beauty Gabrielle d'Estrées), who joined the "parti des mécontents" (party of discontent) led by Henri II, Prince of Condé, was besieged and taken by troops sent by Richelieu, the secretary of state for war. Its demolition was started, but not carried through to the end because of the enormity of the task. The exterior works were razed, the roofs destroyed and holes made in the towers and curtain walls.

The castle remained a ruin for more than two centuries. Napoleon I bought it in 1810 for less than 3,000 francs. During the 19th century, with the rediscovery of the architectural heritage of the Middle Ages, it became a "romantic ruin": in August 1832, Louis-Philippe gave a banquet there on the occasion of the marriage of his daughter Louise to Léopold de Saxe-Cobourg Gotha, first king of the Belgians. Among other artists, Corot depicted the ruins in several works between 1834 and 1866. The Château de Pierrefonds has been classified as a monument historique by the French Ministry of Culture since 1848.

Louis-Napoléon Bonaparte (later Napoleon III of France) visited the castle in 1850. As emperor, he asked Viollet-le-Duc in 1857 to undertake its restoration, which was continued by Maurice Ouadou and then Juste Lisch until 1885. There was no question of a simple repair to the habitable parts (the keep and annexes): the "picturesque" ruins in front were to be kept for decor. In 1861, the project grew in scale: the sovereign wanted to create an imperial residence, so the castle was to be entirely rebuilt. The works, which would cost 5 million francs, of which 4 million were to come from the civil list, were stopped in 1885, six years after the death of Viollet-le-Duc. The departure of Napoléon III had halted the reconstruction and, through lack of money, the decoration of rooms was unfinished. Inside, Viollet-le-Duc produced more a work of invention than restoration (polychrome paintings). He imagined how the castle ought to have been, rather than basing his work on the strict history of the building. On the other hand, with the exterior he showed an excellent knowledge of the military architecture of the 14th century.

Castle today
Château de Pierrefonds has been designated as a monument historique since 1862. It is now managed by the Centre des monuments nationaux.

Media
The castle has often been used as a location for filming including Les Visiteurs, Le Capitan, Highlander: The Series, The Messenger: The Story of Joan of Arc and the 1998 version of The Man in the Iron Mask. The castle was used as the setting for Camelot in the BBC series Merlin; a cut scene of this castle was used to portray Wiz Tech Academy in Disney's TV series, Wizards of Waverly Place. In 2017, the castle was used for filming during the Canal+ and Netflix series Versailles.

Gallery

See also
 List of castles in France
 Domaine du Bois d'Aucourt d'Adolphe Clément-Bayard à Pierrefonds, a former hunting lodge of Louis XIV.

References

External links

 Château de Pierrefonds, Centre des monuments nationaux
 
 Photos of Pierrefonds castle 
 19th century painting of the castle by Gilbert Munger

Castles in Hauts-de-France
Châteaux in Oise
Museums in Oise
Historic house museums in Hauts-de-France
Monuments historiques of Hauts-de-France
Gothic architecture in France
Monuments of the Centre des monuments nationaux